ATP2A2 also known as sarcoplasmic/endoplasmic reticulum calcium ATPase 2 (SERCA2) is an ATPase associated with Darier's disease and Acrokeratosis verruciformis.

This gene encodes one of the SERCA Ca(2+)-ATPases, which are intracellular pumps located in the sarcoplasmic or endoplasmic reticula of muscle cells. This enzyme catalyzes the hydrolysis of ATP coupled with the translocation of calcium from the cytosol to the sarcoplasmic reticulum lumen, and is involved in calcium sequestration associated with muscular excitation and contraction. Alternative splicing results in multiple transcript variants encoding different isoforms.

References

External links